A Man's Land is a 1932 American pre-Code Western film, written by Adele Buffington and directed by Phil Rosen. It stars Hoot Gibson, Marion Shilling, and Robert Ellis, and was released on June 11, 1932.

Plot
Tex Mason's ranch is facing a lot of cattle rustling that will put them out of business. Unknown to Tex is that Joe, one of his ranch hands, is in cahoots with John Thomas who desires to take over the ranch for himself when it fails. When the actual owner of the ranch, who lives in Chicago dies, he leaves half the ranch to Tex and half to his daughter, Peggy Turner. Peggy desires to turn the cattle ranch into a dude ranch.

Accompanied by her maiden Aunt Flossie, Peggy travels West and immediately butts horns with Tex. Peggy feels that cattle branding is cruelty to dumb animals, and turns against Tex when he dresses the cattle up in pink and blue ribbons. John Thomas befriends Peggy and sees the chance to set Tex up with the blame for the rustling.

Cast list
 Hoot Gibson as Tex Mason
 Marion Shilling as Peggy Turner
 Robert Ellis as John Thomas
 Ethel Wales as Flossie Doolittle
 Skeeter Bill Robbins as Skeeter
 Alan Bridge as Steve
 Charles King as Joe
 Hal Burney as Jake
 Fred Gilman as Deputy Fred
 G. Raymond Nye as Pudge

References

External links 
 
 
 

Films directed by Phil Rosen
American Western (genre) films
1932 Western (genre) films
1932 films
American black-and-white films
1930s American films